Bodhe may refer to:

Bodhe, Nepal
Boite mac Cináeda or Bodhe (d. 1058), Scottish prince